Gerard Hartmann is a physical therapist in Limerick, Ireland. Hartmann has also collaborated with Nike Inc. on Nike Free running shoe.

Athletes Gerard Hartmann worked with
Paula Radcliffe - marathon world record holder
Khalid Khannouchi - former marathon world record holder
Sonia O'Sullivan - 5000m Athens Olympic silver medalist
Henry Sheflin - Kilkenny hurler - got him fit for All Ireland hurling final when earlier diagnosis was for several months out of the game which he will now have after tearing it fully only a few minutes after taking the field in the final.

Reference list

4. http://www.independent.ie/sport/hurling/shefflin-recovery-absurd-2322902.html

See also
Nike Free

External links
Ironman.com interview
American Track and Field feature on Nike Free

Year of birth missing (living people)
Living people
Irish physiotherapists